Ufuk Ceylan (born 23 June 1986) is a Turkish professional footballer who plays as a goalkeeper.

Club career

Galatasaray
On 2 September 2009, Ceylan signed for Galatasaray from Manisaspor, keeping him at the Istanbul club until June 2014. He made his debut for the club during a Turkish Cup match against Orduspor on 10 January 2010.

On 3 December 2013, was he the big name in the match after saving 4 penalties and taking Galatasaray through to the next round on the campaign's Turkish Cup.

International career
He has represented his country several times at youth level. Fatih Terim called him up to the senior squad during some friendly matches against Ivory Coast, Azerbaijan and France but was an unused substitute.

Career statistics
.

Club

Honours
Galatasaray
Süper Lig: 2011–12, 2012–13
Süper Kupa: 2012, 2013
Türkiye Kupası: 2013–14

References

External links

 
 Statistics at TFF.org 
 

1986 births
Living people
Footballers from İzmir
Turkish footballers
Turkey under-21 international footballers
Turkey B international footballers
Association football goalkeepers
Turkey youth international footballers
Altay S.K. footballers
Manisaspor footballers
Galatasaray S.K. footballers
İstanbul Başakşehir F.K. players
Alanyaspor footballers
Yeni Malatyaspor footballers
Süper Lig players
TFF First League players